Elvetham Heath LNR is a   local nature reserve in Elvetham Heath in Hampshire. It is owned by Elvetham Heath Developments (on a 999-year lease to Hart District Council) and managed by Hart Countryside Service.

Typical heathland plants such as heather and gorse are regenerating naturally on the heath, and there are other habitats such as reedbeds and wet woodland, which has the rare plant bog myrtle.

References

Local Nature Reserves in Hampshire